Kristian Mauritz Mustad (28 February 1848 – 26 December 1913) was a Norwegian politician for the Liberal Party.

He was elected to the Norwegian Parliament in 1883, representing the constituency of Kristians Amt. He was re-elected in 1886, 1889 and 1892.

He worked as an attorney. His son Sigbjørn Mustad followed in his footsteps, both as a jurist and as a member of Parliament. Kristian Mauritz Mustad was the son of Ole Hovelsen Mustad and brother of Hans Mustad, and grandson of Hans Hansen Schikkelstad.

References

1848 births
1913 deaths
Members of the Storting
Politicians from Gjøvik
Liberal Party (Norway) politicians